Acebes del Páramo is a locality located in the municipality of Bustillo del Páramo, in León province, Castile and León, Spain. As of 2020, it has a population of 154.

Geography 
Acebes del Páramo is located 35km southwest of León.

References

Populated places in the Province of León